Mixogaster is a genus of hoverflies native to North America and South America, with 21 known species. Mixogaster is distinct by lacking an appendix on vein R4+5, having a reduced and bare metasternum, an unarmed scutellum, and usually an appendix on vein M extending in cell R4+5. Larvae are found in ant nests.

Species

References

Hoverfly genera
Diptera of North America
Diptera of South America
Microdontinae
Taxa named by Pierre-Justin-Marie Macquart